The 2021 Peach Bowl was a college football bowl game between the Georgia Bulldogs and Cincinnati Bearcats that was played on January 1, 2021, with kickoff scheduled for 12:30 p.m. EST on ESPN. It was the 53rd edition of the Peach Bowl, and was one of the 2020–21 bowl games concluding the 2020 FBS football season. Sponsored by restaurant chain Chick-fil-A, the game was officially known as the Chick-fil-A Peach Bowl. The game averaged 8.72 million viewers, becoming the most viewed non-semifinal Peach Bowl. Georgia represented the Southeastern Conference (SEC) and Cincinnati represented the American Athletic Conference (AAC).The game was the final game of the 2020 football season for each team and resulted in a 24–21 Georgia victory.

Teams
As one of the New Year's Six bowl games, the participants of the game were determined by the College Football Playoff selection committee. The committee matched No. 8 Cincinnati of the American Athletic Conference (The American) against No. 9 Georgia of the Southeastern Conference (SEC). Georgia had won both of the teams' prior two meetings, in 1942 and 1976.

Georgia Bulldogs

Georgia entered the bowl with a 7–2 record, all in SEC contests. Georgia played five ranked teams, losing to Alabama and Florida while defeating Auburn, Tennessee, and Missouri. The Bulldogs had a 3–2 record in prior Peach Bowls, most recently appearing in, and winning, the 2006 Chick-fil-A Bowl when it was known by that name.

Cincinnati Bearcats

Cincinnati entered the bowl with a 9–0 record. After going 6–0 in conference play, the Bearcats defeated Tulsa in the AAC Championship Game. Cincinnati defeated three ranked teams during the season: Tulsa, Army, and SMU. This was the first appearance by the Bearcats in a Peach Bowl.

Game summary
Cincinnati lead 21-10 going into the fourth quarter with Georgia having not scored a touchdown since the first quarter.

Georgia's comeback win marked Kirby Smart's biggest comeback win at his tenure with Georgia.

First quarter 
Georgia got the ball first and was forced to punt on the first drive. One Cincinnati's first drive they were also forced to punt. On the ensuing Georgia drive punter Jake Camarda's shanked 4 yard punt put Cincinnati in UGA territory. Desmond Ridder capped off the Bearcats drive with a 14 yard touchdown pass to Alec Pierce. After a JT Daniels interception and Cincinnati punt, Georgia got on the board on a 16 yard George Pickens touchdown to end the first quarter with a 7-7 tie.

Second quarter 
The two teams traded possessions before Cincinnati missed a field goal. Georgia responded with a 38 yard Jack Podlesney field goal to give Georgia their first lead of the game. The Bearcats would answer back with an 11 yard touchdown to give them a 14-10 lead at half time.

Third quarter 
Cincinnati scored on a 79 yard touchdown run by Jerome Ford on the second play of the half. On the next drive, Georgia drove down to the Bearcats 18 yard line before a JT Daniels fumble gave the ball back to Cincinnati. The two teams traded turns with the ball with neither team scoring.

Fourth quarter 
The fourth quarter started with Cincinnati having the ball. Georgia linebacker Azeez Ojulari sacked Desmond Ridder forcing a fumble. Adam Anderson would pick it up for Georgia giving them the ball in Bearcat territory. The Bulldogs would score on a Zamir White touchdown run on the following possession. Cincinnati would punt and a Georgia 32 yard field goal shortened the Bearcat's 21-19 lead. The teams then traded punts. The Bulldogs started burning timeouts and Cincinnati was a first down away from winning. It was third down and two. Ridder threw an incomplete pass giving Georgia one last chance to win. JT Daniels lead Georgia to the Bearcat 36 yard line. Jack Podlesney would then make a 53-yard field goal, tying the Peach Bowl record for longest field goal, to give Georgia a 22-21 lead with two seconds remaining. On the last play of the game Azeez Ojulari would sack Ridder in the end zone for a safety to seal a 24-21 Georgia victory.

Scoring summary

Statistics

2021 season 
The following season both Georgia and Cincinnati made the College Football Playoff. Despite not winning, the Peach Bowl was seen as a statement game for Cincinnati and The Group of 5. Georgia finished the year with a perfect 12-0 record before losing to Alabama in the 2021 SEC Championship. Cincinnati finished undefeated at 13-0. Georgia played Michigan in the 2021 Orange Bowl, winning 34-11. Cincinnati played Alabama in the 2021 Cotton Bowl, losing 27-6. Georgia re-matched Alabama in the 2022 National Championship Game winning 33-18 to claim their first Championship since 1980.

Notes

References

External links

Game statistics at statbroadcast.com

Peach Bowl
Peach Bowl
Peach Bowl
Peach Bowl
Peach Bowl
Georgia Bulldogs football bowl games
Cincinnati Bearcats football bowl games